Knut Jahr Bjøro (9 September 1925 – 31 March 2010) was a Norwegian physician.

He was born in Skedsmo. He took the Dr. Med. degree in 1966. He worked at Rikshospitalet, and was hired as a docent at the University of Oslo. He was a professor from 1971 to his retirement, and his specialties were obstetrics and gynaecology. He died in March 2010.

References

1925 births
2010 deaths
Norwegian obstetricians and gynaecologists
Academic staff of the University of Oslo
Oslo University Hospital people
University of Oslo alumni
People from Skedsmo